Phil P. Leventis is a former Democratic member of the South Carolina Senate who represented the 35th District from 1980 to 2012.

Born in Lexington County, South Carolina, Leventis graduated from the University of Virginia in 1969. He then received his commission as second lieutenant from the United States Air Force. He then became an air force pilot. Leventis retired from the South Carolina Air National Guard as Assistant Adjutant General for Air in 1999 after 30 years of service.  During his service he amassed more than 3,600 hours of flying time, mostly in the F-102, A-7, and F-16, and flew 21 combat missions over Kuwait and Iraq during Operation Desert Storm.  His grade upon retirement, Brigadier General, was federally recognized in March 1998.

References

External links
South Carolina Legislature - Senator Phil P. Leventis official SC Senate website
Project Vote Smart - Senator Phil P. Leventis (SC) profile
Follow the Money - Phil P. Leventis
2006 2004 2002 2000 1996 Senate campaign contributions
 2002 Lieutenant Governor campaign contributions

1945 births
Living people
People from Lexington County, South Carolina
University of Virginia alumni
Businesspeople from South Carolina
Democratic Party South Carolina state senators